A Bonded Medical Place, also referred to as BMP, is an enrollment place in an Australian medical school that requires students who graduate from the program to work in an area of workforce shortage after completing fellowship. Doctors who graduate from a Bonded Medical Place in a medical program must work a number of years in an area of workforce shortage equal to the number of years of their medical degree. The term bonded means that medical students who graduate from the program are bound by a legal contract to serve in an area of workforce shortage stipulated by the Australian government. The Australian Department of Health mandates that 25 per cent of all Commonwealth Supported Places (CSP), which are places in which the Australian government subsidizes university tuition costs, be set aside to be categorized as Bonded Medical Places. This policy aims to increase the number of doctors in areas with a shortage of trained doctors. Bonded Medical Places are usually offered along with unbonded Commonwealth Supported Places (CSP) and Medical Rural Bonded Scholarships (MRBS).

References

http://www.health.gov.au/internet/main/publishing.nsf/Content/work-bonded-medical-places-scheme-frequently-asked-questions#eight

Medical education in Australia